Paul David Neil Hebert  (born 1947) is a Canadian biologist. He is founder and director of the Centre for Biodiversity Genomics at the University of Guelph in Ontario, Canada. He applied the technique invented by Carl Woese and colleagues in the 1980s to arthropods and called it DNA barcoding.

Hebert holds the Tier 1 Canada Research Chair in molecular biodiversity at the University of Guelph where he is a tenured professor in the Department of Integrative Biology. He is an Officer of the Order of Canada, a fellow of the Royal Society of Canada, and received the 2018 Heineken Prize for environmental sciences,  and the 2020 MIDORI Prize for Biodiversity.

In 2021 he was awarded the honorary degree of Doctor Honoris Causa at the Norwegian University of Science and Technology (NTNU). Hebert also holds honorary degrees from Western University, University of Windsor and University of Waterloo in Canada.

References

1947 births
Living people
Canadian biologists
Carcinologists
Evolutionary biologists
Fellows of the Royal Society of Canada
Academic staff of the University of Guelph
Canada Research Chairs
Officers of the Order of Canada
Winners of the Heineken Prize